St Nicholas' Church is a church in Bringhurst, Leicestershire. It is a Grade II* listed building.

History
The church is made up of a chancel, tower dating from 1180, nave, clerestory and north and south aisles. The north arcade is the oldest part of the church, dating from the late Norman period.

The bells in the tower were removed in 1970. The south aisle dates from c1200 and the chancel has been altered many times, most recently during Ewan Christian's restoration in 1862–63. The chancel has the royal coat of arms of George III dating from 1814.

Notes

References

Bringhurst
Bringhurst